Albina Grčić (born 6 February 1999), known professionally by the mononym Albina, is a Croatian singer. She began her career after participating in season three of The Voice Hrvatska where she finished third. She represented Croatia in the Eurovision Song Contest 2021 in Rotterdam with the song "Tick-Tock”.

Career
Grčić was born in Split, although her father Božinko "Kićo" hails from Dicmo and her mother Marija "Rina" is from Tijarica. She auditioned for the second season of X Factor Adria in Belgrade, Serbia by singing "Ako izgubim te ja" (If I Lose You) by Oliver Dragojević. Advancing to the next round, the production decided to form a girl group with Grčić as a member. She declined the offer and ended her participation at the show. Starting 7 December 2019, Albina Grčić appeared as a contestant on the third season of the reality talent show The Voice Hrvatska. On the first show, Grčić sang Laura Pausini's song "En cambio no" (Instead, No). Two judges, Vanna and Davor Gobac turned around with Grčić choosing Vanna as her coach. On 11 January 2020, during the Knockout Stage, Grčić sang "A Million Dreams" by Pink and advanced to the Battle Round. On 1 February 2020, in the Battle Round, Grčić's coach Vanna put her against Filip Rudan choosing that they both sing "Lovely", originally by Billie Eilish and Khalid. As a result, Vanna picked Rudan to continue his journey into the live shows. Coach Massimo Savić used his save on Grčić and she advanced into the first live episode as a member of his team. On 8 February 2020, at the first live show, Grčić sang a rendition of Zlatan Stipišić Gibonni's song "Nisi više moja bol" (You're No Longer My Pain). In the semi-final, on 15 February 2020, Grčić performed Coldplay's "Fix You" and advanced to the final. In the final, Grčić sang the songs "Suze nam stale na put" (Tears Got in Our Way) along with her coach Savić, "Korake ti znam" (I Know Your Footsteps) by Maya Sar and she re-sang her audition song "En cambio no". She placed third overall behind winner Vinko Ćemeraš and runner-up Filip Rudan.

Immediately after coming third on The Voice, Grčić was signed to a record deal with Universal Music Croatia. On 16 October 2020 her debut single, "Imuna na strah" (Immune to Fear), was released. In December 2020, Grčić was announced as one of the 14 finalists for Dora 2021, the national contest in Croatia to select the country's Eurovision Song Contest 2021 entry. She performed the song "Tick-Tock" which was written by Branimir Mihaljević, Max Cinnamon and Tihana Buklijaš Bakić. At Dora 2021, she won both the jury and televote with a total of 198 points and went to represent Croatia in the Eurovision Song Contest 2021 in the Netherlands. Grčić performed in the first semi-final on 18 May 2021, but failed to qualify to the final, finishing 11th. Despite failing to qualify, the song became a hit in Croatia. On 25 February 2021, Grčić was nominated for Best New Artist at the 2021 edition of the Porin Awards, which she won at the award's ceremony on 6 June 2021.

On July 24 she informed her fans through Instagram about her new single called "La, La, Love", which was released on July 30. Later that year, on 26 November 2021, Grčić released her fourth single "Plači mila".

On 19 February 2022, during Dora 2022, she premiered her new single, "Noću". In early 2023, Grčić released two additional stand-alone singles, "27." and "Žar", a collaboration with Croatian singer Đana.

Discography

Singles

Awards and nominations

References

External links

1999 births
21st-century Croatian women singers
Living people
Croatian pop singers
Croatian pop musicians
Musicians from Split, Croatia
The Voice (franchise) contestants
Eurovision Song Contest entrants for Croatia
Eurovision Song Contest entrants of 2021